Robert Pralgo (born June 4, 1966) is an American actor.

Pralgo was born in the Bronx in New York City. He graduated with a "BA Television and Film Production" at the University of Georgia in 1989. After graduation, he worked as a bartender while attending acting classes at Atlanta and a few years later, he moved to Los Angeles where he continued with his studies in the field of acting. He started to appear in hearings and agents in Atlanta and got his first works in advertising, video and television series with Houghton Agency.

Filmography

References

External links

Living people
American male television actors
1966 births